Haxo is a ghost station on the Paris Métro. It lies on an unused connecting branch between lines 3bis and 7bis.

History 
The station is situated on a line which was constructed in the 1920s between Porte des Lilas (line 3bis) and Pré-Saint-Gervais (line 7bis). A single track was built linking Place des Fêtes to Porte des Lilas, known as la voie des Fêtes, with one intermediate station, Haxo. For traffic in the other direction, another track was constructed linking Porte des Lilas to Pré Saint-Gervais, with no intermediate station, called la voie navette. Consequently, Haxo would have been a single-direction station with only one platform, like Mirabeau.

However, despite the network owners, the City of Paris, having delivered the necessary infrastructure, the railway operator, Compagnie du chemin de fer métropolitain de Paris, did not consider a service to be sufficiently profitable.

Service trains have never called at Haxo, and no access to street level was ever constructed. Occasional special enthusiast trains call at Haxo for photography, and the station was also used to demonstrate the MF 88 rolling stock to the press in 1993 (the "1993" sign can be seen on some pictures, more than 10 years later).

Future 

A study is being undertaken into the merger of Paris Métro Lines 3bis and 7bis, using the existing currently un-trafficked infrastructure between the two lines, and therefore might finally open Haxo for passenger use. The combined lines would run from Château Landon to Gambetta.

At the moment, the voie navette is blocked near Pré Saint-Gervais by an additional maintenance facility for the MF 88 rolling stock, due to their high failure rates. Therefore, the line merger would first require the MF 88 trains to be replaced by MF 67 units, which would be cascaded from other lines after the arrival of the MF 2000 equipment.

Station layout

Note: Line 7bis does not pass through here on its way to Pré Saint-Gervais; it uses an outer track next to the side platform which is not visible from the platform.

See also 
North End tube station – never-opened station on the London Underground.
Porte Molitor – never-opened station on the Paris Métro.
Kymlinge – never-opened station on the Stockholm Metro.

References

External links 

  Description and photos of Haxo
Photo of Haxo at flickr.com (accessed 5 November 2006)
Description of Haxo station at Breakintoparis.com
Account of visit to Haxo Station at Sleepycity.com
Haxo, a dead end station

Paris Métro stations in the 19th arrondissement of Paris
Paris Métro line 3bis
Paris Métro line 7bis
Ghost stations of the Paris Métro
Buildings and structures completed in 1921